Jin Zhenji (Korean ; born February 1959) is a Chinese politician of Korean ethnic origin. He joined the Communist Party of China in November 1979.   He attended Jilin University and earned a degree in global economics.  He successively served as the head of the Communist Youth League organization in Jilin, the prefecture commissioner of Yanbian Korean Autonomous Prefecture.  In March 2007, he became vice governor of Jilin; in April 2011, he was named the head of the Political and Legal Affairs Commission of Jilin province, and a member of the provincial Party Standing Committee. 

Jin was an alternate member of the 17th and 18th Central Committees of the Communist Party of China; he was elevated to full membership of the 18th Central Committee in October 2015, upon the expulsion of Central Committee member Yang Dongliang.

References

Jilin University alumni
Chinese politicians of Korean descent
1959 births
Living people